Campo do Lenheiro was Corinthians' first football field.

History
The first Corinthians' stadium wasn't actually a stadium. The team played on a field, owned by a wood seller, and because of that, known as Campo do Lenheiro (Portuguese for Wood Seller's Field).

Defunct football venues in Brazil
Football venues in São Paulo
Football venues in São Paulo (state)
Sport Club Corinthians Paulista